Treat Conrad Huey and Izak van der Merwe were the defending champions but decided not to participate.
Marcelo Demoliner and Víctor Estrella defeated Thomas Fabbiano and Riccardo Ghedin 6–4, 6–2 in the final to win the tournament.

Seeds

Draw

Draw

References
 Main Draw

Open Seguros Bolivar - Doubles
2012 D